Rosdoagh Stone Circle is a court cairn and National Monument located in County Mayo, Ireland.

Location

History
The court cairn was built in the Neolithic Age. It was originally recorded as a "druid's circle" as it appears to the casual observer to be two concentric rings, however it is today recognised as a court cairn.

On older maps, it is labeled "Stone Circle", but the current classification is court tomb.

Description
Rosdoagh is a large court cairn, with a near-circular kerb of 33 stones.

A short gallery,
orientated roughly SSE-NNW, opens to the court at the SSE.

References

National Monuments in County Mayo
Archaeological sites in County Mayo